St. John's is the capital and largest city of Antigua and Barbuda, part of the West Indies in the Caribbean Sea. With a population of 22,219, St. John's is the commercial centre of the nation and the chief port of the island of Antigua.

History

The settlement of St. John's has been the administrative centre of Antigua and Barbuda since the islands were first colonised in 1632, and it became the seat of government when the nation achieved independence in 1981.

Economy

St. John's is one of the most developed and cosmopolitan municipalities in the Lesser Antilles. The city is famous for its shopping malls as well as boutiques throughout the city, selling designer jewellery and haute-couture clothing.

St. John's attracts tourists from the resorts on the island and from the cruise ships which dock in its harbour at Heritage Quay and Redcliffe Quay several times a week.

The investment banking industry has a strong presence in the city. Major world financial institutions have offices in St. John's.

There is a market on the southwestern edge of the city where fresh produce, meats, and fresh fish are sold daily.

The Antigua Rum Distillery is located at the Citadel and is the only rum distillery on the island.

Demographics

The majority of the population of St. John's reflects that of the rest of Antigua: people of African and mixed European-African ancestry, with a European minority, including British and Portuguese. There is a population of Levantine Christian Arabs.

Government

St John's is the home of the Parliament of Antigua and Barbuda. St John's is the capital of the Parish of Saint John.

The Eastern Caribbean Civil Aviation Authority has its headquarters on Factory Road in St. John's.

St John's is twinned with Waltham Forest borough in London, England.

Administrative Divisions

Areas 
Areas (or Major Divisions) are the second-level administrative divisions of Antigua and Barbuda. Saint John's is considered a first-level administrative division when it comes to dividing the Major Divisions.

 City Centre
 Greenbay
 Point
 Cook's Hill
 Gray's Farm
 Nut Grove
 Kentish
 Desouza Road
 Browns Avenue
 Villa
 Radio Range
 Sutherlands Development
 Upper Fort Road
 Micheal's Mount
 Princess Margaret
 Upper Gamble's

Boundaries 
The "City of St. John's" is defined by the Public Health Act as:

The "City of St. John's" is defined by the Property Tax Act, 2006 as the region enclosed by Dickenson Bay Street on both sides from the Sea to the North; Independence Avenue on both sides from Robinson Gas Station to the East; All Saints Road on the right from Joseph Lane to Kentish Road; and Perry Bay Road on the right from Kentish Road to Ribbits.

Culture
There are several museums, including the Museum of Antigua and Barbuda and the Museum of Marine Art, a small facility containing fossilised bedrock, volcanic stones, petrified wood, a collection of more than 10,000 shells, and artefacts from English shipwrecks.

Just east of St. John's is the Sir Vivian Richards Stadium, a multi-use stadium in North Sound, that was created mostly for cricket matches, and has hosted the matches during the 2007 Cricket World Cup. The Antigua Recreation Ground, Antigua and Barbuda's national stadium, is located in St. John's.

Geography
Nearby villages and settlements include St. Johnston. McKinnon's Pond is located just north of St. John's.

Main sights
The city's skyline is dominated by the white baroque towers of St. John's Cathedral.

The Botanical Garden is near the intersection of Factory Road and Independence Avenue. This small park's shaded benches and gazebo provide a quiet refuge from the bustle of activity of St. John's.

Sandy Island is a Lighthouse located on a small island about 5 km off the coast leading the way to St. John's harbour.

Fort James stands at the entrance to St. John's harbour. Other nearby forts include Fort George, Fort Charles, Fort Shirley, Fort Berkeley and Fort Barrington.

Government House is the Governor's residence, originally a 19th-century parsonage building. It is included on the World Monuments Fund's 2018 list of monuments at risk, following exposure to severe weather events.

Transportation

St. John's is served by the V. C. Bird International Airport.

Fort Road Heliport is located in the city, on Fort Road.

Education
St. John's is home to two medical schools – the American University of Antigua and University of Health Sciences Antigua. Secondary schools include Christ the King High School, Princess Margaret School and the Antigua Girls High School. Private grade schools include St. John's Lutheran School of the WELS.

Climate
St. John's has a Tropical savanna climate (Koppen: Aw) with summer-like weather year-round, with hot days and warm nights. Rainfall is at its highest during the months of September to November due to hurricane activity.

References

External links

 
 Street map of St John's Antigua From Paradise Islands (non-commercial site)
 Map of St. John's at Caribbean-On-Line.com

 
Capitals in the Caribbean
Populated places in Antigua and Barbuda
Port cities in the Caribbean
Populated places established in 1632
1630s establishments in the Caribbean
1632 establishments in North America
1632 establishments in the British Empire
Capitals in North America